The following is a list of islands of Mayotte:

Table of islands

Other Islands:
Chissioua Handrema
Chissioua Karoni
Chissioua Kolo Issa
Chissioua Mbouini
Chissioua Mtiti
Chissioua Mtsongoma
Chissioua Pengoua
Chissioua Pouhou
Chissioua Sada
Ile Andrema
Ile Blanche
Ile Kakazou
Ile Mogte Amiri
Ile Vatou
Île Verte (Mayotte)
Choazil Islands
Iles Hajangoua
Ilot De Sable Blanc
Les Quatre Freres

See also 
 Communes of Mayotte
 List of cities in Mayotte

 
Islands
Mayotte